The Xieng Khouang Rebellion of 1834 or the Phuan Rebellion was an attempt of the people of muang Xieng Khouang against Vietnamese king Minh Mang's domination over the Principality of Muang Phuan in 1834.

Background 
During the early 19th century, Laos was fragmented into several kingdoms. The Kingdom of Vientiane was tributary to both Siam and Vietnam, and Muang Phuan was a tributary state of Vientiane. In 1814, king Chao Anou (r. 1805–1828) of Vientiane arrested the incumbent ruler of Muang Phuan Chao Noi (r. 1803–1831), and imprisoned him for three years. This decision antagonized Chao Anou, making him an immortal enemy of Chao Noi.

In early 1827, Chao Anou launched a large-scale rebellion against the Siamese. He was, however, defeated and fled to Vietnam, while the capital Vientiane was captured by the Siamese. In August 1828, Chao Anou, fostered by Minh Mang's guards, returned to Vientiane. He instigated a second revolt against Siamese occupants. The Siamese mounted counterattack on Vientiane, razing the city, and chased Chao Anou through Xiengkhouang Plateau where Chao Anou was compromised and captured by Chao Noi, who then revengeful delivered him to the Siamese.

The Vietnamese ruler, considered a nominal ally of Chao Anou, just intended in expanding his sphere of influence over Laos, and did nothing to aid Vientiane. In 1831, Minh Mang sent troops into Muang Phuan, arresting Chao Noi and proceeding to have him executed in Hue City under the pretext of betraying his master. In 1832, Minh Mang annexed the territory of Muang Phuan and established the prefecture of Trấn Ninh. The Phuan people were forced upon Vietnamese attires, languages, and customs aggressively.

Rebellion 
In their 1999 book The Kingdoms of Laos: Six Hundred Years of History, Peter and Sanda Simms state that in 1834, the population of Xieng Khouang launched a rebellion against Vietnamese rule, but were brutally suppressed. They say that about 6,000 Phuan refugees crossed the Mekong River attempting to seek asylum in Siam, but half of them were deported by the Siamese authorities to Bangkok. The rest tried to return home, but most were killed.

However, other sources describe the depopulation as part of systematic forced resettlement campaigns carried out by the Siamese government both in response to Chao Anou's rebellion and in order to create a buffer zone denying Vietnam potential resources in their war over Cambodia. The 1834 depopulation is recorded in the Thai chronicles—which make no mention of a popular revolt—as following a campaign in the war in which the ruler of Phuan sided with Siam and allowed the Siamese army to capture the city from the Vietnamese. According to the Muang Phuan Chronicles, 6,000 captives were taken by the Siamese, though some 3,000 escaped. The folk poem Kap Muang Phuan was written by the escapees who managed to return to Muang Phuan, and describes their ordeal.

Later events 
Another Muang Phuan uprising occurred in 1855, during the reign of Minh Mang's grandson Tu Duc, resulting in Vietnamese control over Xieng Khouang diminished. The eldest son of Chao Noi was enfeoffed King of Xieng Khouang with the title Imperial Mandatory Prince by Tu Duc. Muang Phuan's suzerainty was quickly asserted by Chao Tiantharath (r. 1850–1868), ruler of Kingdom of Luang Prabang. His claim met little concern from Tu Duc, who was dealing with his own series of troubles in Vietnam.

Footnotes

References

See also 
 Lao rebellion (1826–1828)

 

History of Laos
19th century in Laos
Rebellions in Asia
Conflicts in 1830
19th-century rebellions